Josefa Menéndez (4 February 1890 – 29 December 1923) was a Catholic nun and mystic. 

She was born to a Christian family in Madrid, where she suffered various trials. In 1920, at 30, she entered the Society of the Sacred Heart of Jesus in Poitiers. Her religious life was spent cleaning and sewing. While a nun, she reportedly received visions of Jesus.

The Way of Divine Love, reprinted by TAN Books, Inc. (now part of St. Benedict Press) is an account of her life and visions.

References

1890 births
1923 deaths
20th-century Spanish nuns
People from Madrid